Raphael Emílio da Silva (born 17 August 1988), known as Raphael Alemão, is a Brazilian footballer who plays as a goalkeeper.

Honours
Palmeiras
Copa do Brasil: 2012
Campeonato Brasileiro Série B: 2013

References

External links

Raphael Alemão at ZeroZero

1988 births
Living people
People from Piracicaba
Brazilian footballers
Association football goalkeepers
Campeonato Brasileiro Série A players
Sociedade Esportiva Palmeiras players
América Futebol Clube (RN) players
Guaratinguetá Futebol players
Rio Claro Futebol Clube players
Marília Atlético Clube players
Clube Náutico Capibaribe players
Associação Atlética Caldense players
Clube Atlético Sorocaba players
Associação Portuguesa de Desportos players
Footballers from São Paulo (state)